Giv'ot Olam is an Israeli outpost in the northern West Bank. Located 4.5 kilometres south-east of Itamar, it falls under the jurisdiction of Shomron Regional Council.

The outpost was established in late 1998 by Avri Ran, a right wing activist and organic farmer who raises free-range chickens and sells their eggs on the organic food market.

The outpost's name is taken from Moses' Biblical blessing for Joseph: "with the fruitfulness of the hills of eternity." (Deuteronomy 33:15)

The international community considers Israeli settlements in the West Bank illegal under international law, but the Israeli government disputes this.

See also
Ethical consumerism

References

Israeli settlements in the West Bank
Populated places established in 1996
Israeli outposts